Tony Romeo (1938–1995) was an American songwriter.

Tony Romeo may also refer to:

Tony Romeo (American football) (1938–1996), American football player
Tony Romeo (reporter), American newsreporter
Tony Romeo (Neighbours), a character in the Australian soap opera Neighbours

See also
Tony Romo (born 1980), American football player